Ville Rajala (born June 23, 1989) is a Finnish professional ice hockey player. He is currently playing for Hokki of the Finnish Mestis.

Rajala made his Liiga debut playing with Sport during the 2013–14 Liiga season.

References

External links

1989 births
Living people
Vaasan Sport players
KooKoo players
Hokki players
Finnish ice hockey forwards